The 2003 Swedish Golf Tour, titled as the 2003 Telia Tour for sponsorship reasons, was the 20th season of the Swedish Golf Tour.

Most tournaments also featured on the 2003 Nordic Golf League.

Schedule
The following table lists official events during the 2003 season.

Order of Merit
The Order of Merit was based on prize money won during the season, calculated using a points-based system.

See also
2003 Danish Golf Tour
2003 Finnish Tour
2003 Swedish Golf Tour (women)

Notes

References

Swedish Golf Tour
Swedish Golf Tour